Europa Universalis III is a grand strategy video game developed by Paradox Development Studio and published by Paradox Interactive. The game was released for Microsoft Windows in January 2007, and was later ported to OS X by Virtual Programming in November 2007.

The player controls a nation and handles matters concerning war, diplomacy, trade, and economy. The original game without expansions starts in 1453, right after the Fall of Constantinople, and continues to 1789, just past the beginning of the French Revolution. The expansion Napoleon's Ambition extends the end game year forward to 1821, whereas the expansion In Nomine moves the starting year back to 1399, making it the longest as far as gameplay time in the series thus far.

Europa Universalis III was the first to use Paradox's new 3D engine, Clausewitz Engine, that required user systems to meet the Pixel Shader 2.0 specification. The map has 1,700 land and sea provinces encompassing most of the world, with 250 playable historical nations. The game also uses elements of other Paradox games such as Crusader Kings, Victoria, and Hearts of Iron II.

Gameplay

Players begin the game by choosing what date they would like to start their campaign and which country they would like to play as. Once in game, players can shape their countries in many different ways. Forms of government include various kingdoms, republics, theocracies, and tribal governments. Players can influence a nation's society and values by adjusting "sliders" such as free trade/mercantilism, and may hire court advisors such as Wolfgang Amadeus Mozart. As the game advances, players can pick "national ideas" such as Liberté, Égalité, Fraternité, which give specialized bonuses.

The game has over 300 playable countries, including giants like Ming China, regional powers like Bohemia and Kazan, and tiny nations like the Maldives. Without formal victory conditions, players sometimes set goals for themselves like raising a minor city-state to world prominence. The world map includes some 1,700 provinces and sea zones. Many provinces in the Americas, Africa, and Oceania are not owned by any country, allowing for colonization.

Economics in the early modern era is simulated by taxes and production income from provinces, as well as trade. National merchants compete in "centers of trade" such as Venice and Lübeck, and nations focused on trading income (e.g., Holland) enjoy significant advantages. Nations which mint too much currency, or are over-reliant on gold mining, are penalized by inflation. Technology investment is important in the long run; the game does not use a Civ-style tech tree, but instead has several different technology categories, which unlock new military units and buildings.

Diplomacy is rather detailed: royal marriages, insults, alliances, trade embargoes, and so on all affect relations between countries. Players are able to gain control over other countries peacefully through personal unions and vassalage. Early international institutions such as the Holy Roman Empire, the Papal Curia and with the Divine Wind expansion the Shogunate are simulated in some depth. Every country has its own culture and religion, a frequent source of diplomatic unity or friction.

Rulers have control over armies, navies, and mercenaries they recruit. Combat is abstract, with no direct control over battles (in contrast to the Total War games). Military tradition is necessary for recruiting good generals and admirals. Aggression (seizing provinces without a rightful claim) is checked by the "badboy" system of international infamy common to Paradox's games.

The game is historically detailed; one can play the "grand campaign" starting in 1453 or 1399, but any date before the French Revolution (1821 with the Napoleon's Ambition expansion) is a valid starting point as well, with historical leaders and countries appropriately updated. Major events such as the War of the League of Cambrai are playable this way. Often the game diverges from reality after some time in-game, with unhistorical events such as Portugal colonizing North America, or Poland-Lithuania surviving to bully its neighbors.

The game may be played single-player or multiplayer, with players controlling different countries; every non-human country is controlled by its own AI.

Development

Expansion packs

Paradox has released 4 expansion packs for Europa Universalis III; each one requires all the previous expansions. One version of the game, Europa Universalis III Complete, includes the original game and the first two expansions. Another version, Europa Universalis III Chronicles, includes the original game and all four expansions.

Napoleon's Ambition
An expansion pack named Napoleon's Ambition was released on 22 August 2007 via GamersGate, a digital distribution platform. The Windows version of the expansion is available as a download from GamersGate or as part of the Europa Universalis III Complete retail package, and aims to expand on EUIII with an improved interface, an enhanced trade system, expanded options, and the inclusion of more content to cover the extended time period. Virtual Programming published the Napoleon's Ambition expansion pack for Mac OS X on 7 December the same year.

In Nomine
A second expansion titled In Nomine was released on 28 May 2008. Features include: a further extension of the game's time frame, the addition of the Byzantine Empire, a revised AI which focuses on strategic top-level goals, and completely reworked rebels with their own goals and abilities. Virtual Programming published the In Nomine expansion for Mac OS X on 18 August.
The game now starts earlier, beginning in October 1399 after the coronation of Henry IV of England. Because the game's time frame has been extended by 54 years, it now includes nations such as the Byzantine Empire and the Jalayirids, leaders like Tamerlane, and events such as the end of the Hundred Years' War.

A key variation of the expansion is the ability for the player to make important decisions that will shape the future of their country. For instance, a player can choose to create the United Kingdom, make Paris "worth a Mass", or institute an East Indian Trade Company. They can now implement decisions on both country and province level with the new decision system, including hundreds of different decisions depending on the situation (for example, the current state religion) and country.

In Nomine also features 'rebels with a cause'. There are several types of rebels (Religious, Patriotic, Peasant...), with different goals and different abilities. For example, if patriotic rebels take control of a province, that province will suffer from 10 more years of nationalism and is more likely to defect. Other rebels include colonial rebels in your colonies determined to get representation or independence and reactionary nobles rising up to put the serfs back in their place. The players can now choose between crushing rebels using military force, negotiating with them, or leaving them and watching them enforce their demands on your country.

Both Napoleon's Ambition and In Nomine are included in Europa Universalis III Complete.

Heir to the Throne
The third expansion titled Heir to the Throne was released for Windows on 15 December 2009 and includes many features requested by members of the forum. As the title suggests, it is focused mostly on royal family dynamics. Virtual Programming published the Mac OS X expansion on 24 May 2010.

Divine Wind
In May 2010, a poll was created on the Paradox forums by a developer in which users could vote for a new expansion. Options included expansions to Europa Universalis III, Europa Universalis: Rome, Hearts of Iron III and Victoria II. With 46% of the votes, the poll was won in favour of a Europa Universalis III expansion which is to focus on the rest of the world. The new expansion is called Divine Wind. It requires Europa Universalis III Complete and the expansion Heir to the Throne in order to play. The expansion pack was released on December 14, 2010.

Divine Wind was published for Mac OS X by Virtual Programming on March 16, 2011.

Compilation
Released on March 22, 2011, Europa Universalis III: Chronicles bundled all four expansions with the original game. This was the first time Heir to the Throne and Divine Wind became available in retail.

Europa Universalis III: Chronicles was published for Mac OS X by Virtual Programming on September 28, 2011.

Mods
Most of EU3's settings are in plain text files that are easily changed to modify the map, historical events, etc. Some popular mods extensively change the game, adding historical flavor, fantasy scenarios, or new game mechanics.

Magna Mundi spin-off
One mod for EU3 is Magna Mundi, which aims to add detail to the game's map and to steer the course of the alternate history portrayed by the game more towards real-world history by means of scripted events. A standalone version of Magna Mundi was planned as a spin-off game, to be developed by the mod's authors, operating as the development studio Universo Virtual, and to be published by Paradox. In 2012, MM was cancelled by Paradox, who cited lack of progress as well as a lack of trust in the developers as the reasons for this decision: according to a Paradox spokesman, "members within the MM team [...] report to us that the project lacks active leadership".

Universo Virtual, claiming to have had a game ready for release, announced legal action against Paradox.
Its leader, Portuguese developer Carlos Gustavo, accused Paradox of having come up with new requirements several times during development of Magna Mundi. He also claimed that Paradox did not own the source code licensed to him, and announced a release of what was to be Magna Mundi the game, now re-titled World Stage. No release date was put and the project's status is unclear.

Sequel
The game's sequel, Europa Universalis IV, was released on August 13, 2013.

Reception 

Europa Universalis III received an 83% rating on Metacritic, indicating generally positive reviews. In a review for Eurogamer, Alec Meer gave the game a 7 out of 10, stating that it had "near unparalleled flexibility" and that it was "capable of inspiring immense self-satisfaction", while also criticising the game for its obtuse mechanics, especially the ideas system. Nicholas Bale of Game Revolution also gave a positive review, calling it "rich strategic title with a bevy of options available".

See also

List of grand strategy video games 
List of Paradox Interactive games 
Wargame (video games)

References

External links
 
 Official wiki

2007 video games
Age of Discovery video games
Government simulation video games
Grand strategy video games
MacOS games
Action-adventure games
Paradox Interactive games
Real-time strategy video games
Video game sequels
Video games set in the 15th century
Video games set in the 16th century
Video games set in the 17th century
Video games set in the 18th century
Video games set in the Russian Empire
Video games with expansion packs
Windows games
Video games developed in Sweden